Kaukana, also spelled Caucana, is a hamlet (frazione) of Santa Croce Camerina, a municipality in the Province of Ragusa, Sicily. It is located a few hundred metres from Punta Secca and a few km from Marina di Ragusa.

It lies near Kaukanai, an ancient Greek port city.

History

Ancient city

The fertile territory is rich in water and became the location of tiny settlements early in the Greek period, which together took the name Kaukanai. When the Roman consul Aulus Atilius Calatinus destroyed Camarina in 258 BC, the fleeing inhabitants of Camarina found refuge here. The Romans in the Imperial period expanded the port of Kaukanai which remained important for several centuries, up until the Byzantine period. There are remains of a three-naved cemetery church with tombs dug in the floor. Kaukanai was destroyed by Saracens around 827.

The excavations have revealed an interesting urban settlement with simple rectangular houses of two or three rooms as well as buildings with more rooms and a few with stairs and courtyards. The area was visited and studied by the famous archaeologist Paolo Orsi. The discoveries made in the area are on display in the Museo archeologico ibleo in Ragusa.

The area forms the Parco archeologico di Kaukana with ruins of a commercial dock of late Roman and Byzantine date.

Modern Caucana 
In recent times, Kaukana has experienced a boom of settlement by tourists and beachgoers, principally in the summer months, since it is near the main beaches of Punta Secca, Punta Braccetto and Casuzze.  The two main beaches of Caucana are characterised by fine sand and a marvellous sea. There are only soft westerly breezes and siroccos from Africa.

The sailing club of Kaukana is well-known meeting place for sailors and hosts important sporting events every year, like the Sicilian 470 class championships.

Geography
The village is a seaside resort  on the Mediterranean coast, located between Punta Secca, Marina di Ragusa and Casuzze. It is 5 km far from Santa Croce Camerina, 13 from Donnalucata, 18 from Scoglitti, 20 from Scicli, 23 from Ragusa, 24 from Vittoria and Comiso, and 30 from Modica.

References

External links
 Kaukana Archaeological Park on the Sicilian regional website

Frazioni of the Province of Ragusa
Archaeological sites in Sicily